Andalusia High School is a high school in Andalusia, Alabama, founded in 1899. The school colors are cardinal and white and the school mascot is the bulldog.

History
Andalusia High School was housed in the Church Street School from 1923 to 1941.

In 2018, the school's football stadium and auditorium were renovated, costing $12 million.

Demographics
AHS is 63 percent white, 33 percent black, two percent Asian, and one percent of students identify as a part of two or more races.

Athletics
The AHS baseball team won a state championship in 2018.
In 1996, with a record of 32–4, the AHS Boys basketball team won a state championship in basketball and the AHS girls won in 2002. In 2022, the AHS American football team won their first state championship for the first time in 42 years.

Notable alumni
Jackie Burkett, former NFL player. He transferred to Choctawhatchee High School after his sophomore season.
Nico Johnson, NFL player and college football coach
Robert Horry, former NBA player and seven-time league champion.

References

External links
Andalusia City Schools Website.

Educational institutions established in 1899
Public high schools in Alabama
Schools in Covington County, Alabama
1899 establishments in Alabama